is a private junior college in Ukyō-ku, Kyoto, Japan. It was established as a junior college in 1950, and is now attached to Kyoto University of Foreign Studies.

Departments
 Department of English studies

External links
 

Private universities and colleges in Japan
Japanese junior colleges
Universities and colleges in Kyoto